The 1937 East Tennessee State Teachers Buccaneers football team was an American football team that represented State Teachers College, Johnson City—now known as East Tennessee State University (ETSU)—as a member of the Smoky Mountain Conference in the 1937 college football season. They were led by sixth-year head coach Gene McMurray. The 1937 team had their first losing season in six years.

Schedule

References

East Tennessee State Teachers
East Tennessee State Buccaneers football seasons
East Tennessee State Teachers Buccaneers football